Ismael Govea Solórzano (born 20 February 1997) is a Mexican professional footballer who plays as a right-back for Liga MX club Tijuana, on loan from Santos Laguna.

International career
Govea was included in the under-21 roster that participated in the 2018 Toulon Tournament, where Mexico would finish runners-up.

Govea was called up by Jaime Lozano to participate with the under-22 team at the 2019 Toulon Tournament, where Mexico won third place. He was called up by Lozano again to participate at the 2019 Pan American Games, with Mexico winning the third-place match.

Career statistics

Club

International

Honours
Mexico U23
Pan American Bronze Medal: 2019

References

External links
 
 

1997 births
Living people
Mexico international footballers
Association football defenders
Atlas F.C. footballers
Liga MX players
Liga Premier de México players
Tercera División de México players
Footballers from Michoacán
Mexican footballers
Pan American Games medalists in football
Pan American Games bronze medalists for Mexico
Footballers at the 2019 Pan American Games
Medalists at the 2019 Pan American Games